Zvonko Varga (born 27 November 1959) is a Serbian football manager and former player.

Club career
Varga made his senior debut at Crvenka in the Yugoslav Second League, before moving to Yugoslav First League side Partizan without his club's permission. He would occasionally train with Second League club Rad, before being cleared to play for Partizan. From then on, Varga spent eight seasons with the Crno-beli (1978–1986), making 199 appearances and scoring 58 goals in the top flight of Yugoslav football. He also won two national championship titles (1983 and 1986).

In 1986, Varga moved abroad to Belgium and played for Club Liégeois over the next seven seasons. He was the Belgian league's second-highest scorer in the 1988–89 season with 22 goals, one less than Eddie Krncevic. On 13 May 1989, Varga scored all six goals in his team's 6–1 home league win over Beerschot. He would win the Belgian Cup in the following 1989–90 campaign. In the summer of 1993, Varga switched to Seraing, but returned to Club Liégeois a year later.

International career
At international level, Varga represented Yugoslavia at the 1979 FIFA World Youth Championship. He appeared in all three games, as the team exited the tournament at the group stage.

Managerial career
After starting his managerial career with Tilleur-Liégeois, Varga went back to his homeland and took over the helm of OFK Beograd in 2000. He was also manager of Rad for several months, before being named assistant manager to Lothar Matthäus at Partizan. Following the departure of Matthäus, Varga left his position and became manager of Sartid Smederevo in January 2004. He resigned from the club after only four games. In June 2004, Varga returned to Partizan to be assistant manager to Vladimir Vermezović. He then served as co-manager of Teleoptik, alongside Blagoje Paunović, between 2005 and 2006, before returning to Partizan as an assistant.

In the second part of 2007, Varga was assistant manager to Dimitri Davidovic at Qatar SC. He then returned to Serbia, taking charge of Teleoptik in early 2008. Varga led them to promotion to the Serbian First League in 2009. He was released in January 2011. Varga again moved to the Middle East and joined Davidovic at Saudi Arabian outfit Ittihad in the second part of 2011. He returned to Partizan in 2012, being an assistant in the following three years.

Personal life
Varga is the father of fellow footballer Saša Varga.

Career statistics

Honours
Partizan
 Yugoslav First League: 1982–83, 1985–86
Club Liégeois
 Belgian Cup: 1989–90

References

External links
 
 
 

Association football forwards
Belgian Pro League players
Challenger Pro League players
Belgian Third Division players
Expatriate football managers in Belgium
Expatriate football managers in Qatar
Expatriate football managers in Saudi Arabia
Expatriate footballers in Belgium
FK Crvenka players
FK Partizan non-playing staff
FK Partizan players
FK Rad managers
FK Smederevo managers
FK Teleoptik managers
OFK Beograd managers
RFC Liège managers
RFC Liège players
R.F.C. Seraing (1904) players
Serbia and Montenegro expatriate football managers
Serbia and Montenegro expatriate footballers
Serbia and Montenegro expatriate sportspeople in Belgium
Serbia and Montenegro football managers
Serbia and Montenegro footballers
Serbian expatriate football managers
Serbian expatriate sportspeople in Qatar
Serbian expatriate sportspeople in Saudi Arabia
Serbian football managers
Serbian footballers
Sportspeople from Zrenjanin
Yugoslav expatriate footballers
Yugoslav expatriate sportspeople in Belgium
Yugoslav First League players
Yugoslav footballers
Yugoslav Second League players
Yugoslavia under-21 international footballers
1959 births
Living people